Thomas Lawford Rolph (13 February 1840 – 5 September 1876) was a Canadian-born lawyer and a cricketer who played in a single first-class cricket match for Cambridge University in 1860. He was born in Dundas, Canada, and died at Gloucester in England.

The elder son of the Canadian politician George Rolph, Thomas Rolph was educated in England at Cheltenham College and at Trinity Hall, Cambridge. He played cricket as a middle-order batsman for his school, but when selected for a single match for Cambridge University against the Cambridge Town Club he failed to score in either innings and was not picked again. He played a few minor cricket matches for amateur sides both during his time at Cambridge and afterwards, but played no more first-class cricket.

Rolph graduated from Cambridge University in 1863 with a Bachelor of Arts degree. He became a solicitor and was part of the London firm of Renshaw and Rolph, with offices in Cannon Street. He married Edith Anna Renshaw on 8 December 1875.

He died in Barnwood, Gloucestershire on 5 September 1876, aged 36.

His brother-in-law Alfred Renshaw played first-class cricket for the Marylebone Cricket Club in 1871.

References

1840 births
1876 deaths
Alumni of Trinity Hall, Cambridge
Cambridge University cricketers
Canadian cricketers
Pre-Confederation Canadian emigrants to the United Kingdom
People educated at Cheltenham College
People from Dundas, Ontario
Sportspeople from Hamilton, Ontario